In mathematics, specifically order theory, the join of a subset  of a partially ordered set  is the supremum (least upper bound) of  denoted  and similarly, the meet of  is the infimum (greatest lower bound), denoted  In general, the join and meet of a subset of a partially ordered set need not exist. Join and meet are dual to one another with respect to order inversion.

A partially ordered set in which all pairs have a join is a join-semilattice.  Dually, a partially ordered set in which all pairs have a meet is a meet-semilattice.  A partially ordered set that is both a join-semilattice and a meet-semilattice is a lattice.  A lattice in which every subset, not just every pair, possesses a meet and a join is  a complete lattice.  It is also possible to define a partial lattice, in which not all pairs have a meet or join but the operations (when defined) satisfy certain axioms.

The join/meet of a subset of a totally ordered set is simply the maximal/minimal element of that subset, if such an element exists.

If a subset  of a partially ordered set  is also an (upward) directed set, then its join (if it exists) is called a directed join or directed supremum. Dually, if  is a downward directed set, then its meet (if it exists) is a directed meet or directed infimum.

Definitions

Partial order approach

  (that is,  is a lower bound of ).
 For any  if  then  (that is,  is greater than or equal to any other lower bound of ).

The meet need not exist, either since the pair has no lower bound at all, or since none of the lower bounds is greater than all the others. However, if there is a meet of  then it is unique, since if both  are greatest lower bounds of  then  and thus  If not all pairs of elements from  have a meet, then the meet can still be seen as a partial binary operation on 

 (commutativity),
 (associativity), and
 (idempotency).

Joins are defined dually with the join of  if it exists, denoted by  

  (that is,  is an upper bound of ).
 For any  if  then  (that is,  is less than or equal to any other upper bound of ).

Universal algebra approach

By definition, a binary operation  on a set  is a  if it satisfies the three conditions a, b, and c.  The pair  is then a meet-semilattice.  Moreover, we then may define a binary relation  on A, by stating that  if and only if   In fact, this relation is a partial order on   Indeed, for any elements 
  since  by c;
 if  then  by a; and
 if  then  since then  by b.

Both meets and joins equally satisfy this definition: a couple of associated meet and join operations yield partial orders which are the reverse of each other. When choosing one of these orders as the main ones, one also fixes which operation is considered a meet (the one giving the same order) and which is considered a join (the other one).

Equivalence of approaches

Thus, the partial order defined by the meet in the universal algebra approach coincides with the original partial order.

and therefore  
Similarly,  and if  is another lower bound of  then  whence

Thus, there is a meet defined by the partial order defined by the original meet, and the two meets coincide.

In other words, the two approaches yield essentially equivalent concepts, a set equipped with both a binary relation and a binary operation, such that each one of these structures determines the other, and fulfill the conditions for partial orders or meets, respectively.

Meets of general subsets

If  is a meet-semilattice, then the meet may be extended to a well-defined meet of any non-empty finite set, by the technique described in iterated binary operations.  Alternatively, if the meet defines or is defined by a partial order, some subsets of  indeed have infima with respect to this, and it is reasonable to consider such an infimum as the meet of the subset.  For non-empty finite subsets, the two approaches yield the same result, and so either may be taken as a definition of meet.  In the case where  subset of  has a meet, in fact  is a complete lattice; for details, see completeness (order theory).

Examples

If some power set  is partially ordered in the usual way (by ) then joins are unions and meets are intersections; in symbols,  (where the similarity of these symbols may be used as a mnemonic for remembering that  denotes the join/supremum and  denotes the meet/infimum). 

More generally, suppose that  is a family of subsets of some set  that is partially ordered by  
If  is closed under arbitrary unions and arbitrary intersections and if  belong to  then 

But if  is not closed under unions then  exists in  if and only if there exists a unique -smallest  such that  

See also

Notes

References

 
 

Binary operations
Binary relations
Lattice theory
Order theory